A watershed district in Russia is any of twenty groups of water bodies listed in the Water Code of Russian Federation, serving as the main unit of management in the field of use and protection of water bodies.

According to chapter 4, article 28 of the Russian Water Code, those are: Baltic Watershed District, Barents–Belomor Watershed District, Dvina–Pechora Watershed District, Dnieper Watershed District, Don Watershed District, Kuban Watershed District, Western Caspian Watershed District, Upper Volga Watershed District, Oka Watershed District, Kama Watershed District, Lower Volga Watershed District, Ural Watershed District, Upper Ob Watershed District, Irtysh Watershed District, Lower Ob Watershed District, Angara–Baikal Watershed District, Yenisey Watershed District, Lena Watershed District, Anadyr–Kolyma Watershed District and Amur Watershed District.

References

Bodies of water of Russia
Political divisions of Russia